Hirata (written: 平田 lit. "peaceful rice paddy") is a Japanese surname. Notable people with the surname include:

, Japanese actor
, Japanese rower
, Japanese scholar
, Japanese politician
, Japanese voice actor
, Japanese singer and voice actress
, Japanese manga artist
, Japanese mixed martial artist
, Japanese professional wrestler
, Japanese footballer
, Japanese politician
, Japanese politician
, Japanese voice actress
, Japanese actor
, Japanese ballerina
, Japanese gymnast
, Japanese badminton player
, Japanese baseball player
, Japanese academic
, Japanese politician
, Japanese actress, voice actress and gravure idol

Other people
Andrea Hirata, Indonesian writer
Bruno Hirata (born 1988), Brazilian baseball player
Gilberto Hirata (born 1953), Mexican politician

Japanese-language surnames